Ying Lianzhi (November 23, 1867 – January 10, 1926), also known as Ying Hua, was a Manchu Bannerman, a prominent Catholic layman who agitated for church reform, founder of the prominent newspaper Ta Kung Pao, and instrumental in founding The Catholic University of Peking.

Biography
From the Manchu Hešeri clan, although his family was not rich and he had no formal schooling, Ying became well versed in the Confucian Classics as a child. After his fiancé was nursed to health by the Sisters of Charity at a Catholic hospital in Beijing, Ying became interested in the writings of Matteo Ricci and several of scholars he converted to Christianity in the late Ming dynasty. These writers convinced Ying that Confucianism and Christianity, Chinese culture and Western culture, were essentially complementary with each other. 

Ying was the founding editor of the Ta Kung Pao in Tianjin in 1902. Ying edited the paper for the next decade, and his extensive writings were influential both for their support of liberal politics and their use of the vernacular language. After the Revolution of 1911, he turned his attention to Catholic education, founding the Fu-jen School for girls. Ying and his friends the reformist priest Vincent Lebbe and the Catholic layman Ma Xiangbo had become increasingly frustrated and resentful over the control of the Chinese Catholic Church and all Catholics in China exercised by the French government and French priests, who constituted 70% of the clergy in China. They called for the Church in China to be controlled by Chinese priests appointed by the Vatican rather than French ones, who blocked the reform efforts of the Pope. Lebbe arranged for an essay of Ying's to be translated into French and sent to Rome. Ying frankly explained that the chauvinism and disdain for Chinese among the French clergy in China was extremely demoralizing for Chinese priests. Ying's critical voice was a major factor in the decision of Pope Benedict XV to direct the founding of a Catholic university, Fujen University, in Beijing. Ying took responsibility for much of the organization and start-up of the university, which opened in 1925. He died of cancer on 2 March 1926 in Beijing.

Personal life
Ying married Shuzhong, a member of the Qing dynasty royal family. Ying Hua's son, Ying Qianli, was an active lay leader in the Catholic Church during the early Republican era. His grandson, Ying Ruocheng, was a prominent actor after 1949 and China's vice minister of culture from 1986 to 1990. His great-grandson, Ying Da, is a prominent actor, director, talk show host, and television show creator in Beijing. His great-great-grandson, Rudi Ying, is a professional ice hockey player.

References

Bibliography

Further reading

 Ying Ruocheng and Claire Conceison, Voices Carry: Behind Bars and Backstage During China's Revolution and Reform. Rowman & Littlefield, 2009. 水流云在：英若成自转。中信出版社 CITIC 2009.

External links
 

1867 births
1926 deaths
Chinese Roman Catholics
Qing dynasty journalists
Republic of China journalists
Writers from Beijing
Manchu people
Manchu Plain Red Bannermen
Educators from Beijing